White Cloud may refer to:

People
 Buck Jones (American football), also called "White Cloud", a Seneca Native American football player active in 1922
 Chief Mahaska (1784–1843), or Mewhushekaw, also known as White Cloud I, Iowa chief 
 Wabanquot (Chippewa chief) (translated as "White Cloud"), an Ojibwa chief 
 Wabokieshiek (translated as "White Cloud"), 19th-century Ho-Chunk chief from Illinois
 James White Cloud (1840–1940), also known as Chief White Cloud, Iowa chief from Kansas
 Francis White Cloud, also called White Cloud II, principal chief of the Iowa who traveled to England and France in 1844–5, son of Mahaska
 Zach Whitecloud (born 1996), a Canadian ice hockey player

Place names
In the United States:
 White Cloud, California, in Nevada County
 White Cloud, Indiana, in Harrison County
 White Cloud, Kansas, in Doniphan County
 White Cloud, Michigan, in Newaygo County
 White Cloud, Missouri, an unincorporated community
 Whitecloud, Nodaway County, Missouri, an unincorporated community
 White Cloud Creek, stream in the U.S. state of Missouri
 White Cloud Township (disambiguation), two different places

Other uses
 Mahpiya Ska, a sacred albino female White Buffalo living in Jamestown, North Dakota
 White Cloud Mountain minnow, a type of fish commonly kept in cold-water aquariums
 White Cloud Naval Ocean Surveillance System, a spaceborne military system launched in 1986 and 1987 which was used primarily by the US Navy
 White Cloud Tradition of Buddhism in China, founded by the Northern Song preacher Qingjue 清覺 (1043-1121), widespread since Yuan (1279-1368), criticized for being used as a tax evasion device by the powerful families of the time.
 White Cloud, a Gaff rigged Yawl built, in the style of a Falmouth Quay Punt, in 1912 by Gann & Palmer in Teignmouth, Devon, UK.
 White Cloud toilet paper
 White Cloud, a record label founded by Jon Mark

See also
Aotearoa
Japanese destroyer Shirakumo